Jean Pérol (born 1932 Vienna) is a French novelist and poet.

Life
He grew up in south-eastern France where he spent his childhood and adolescence. He conducted his graduate studies in Lyon.

He left for Japan in 1961. 
He returned to France in 1989, before moving to Kabul, Afghanistan for two years. 
He also lived for two years in Louisiana in New Orleans, and then two years in New York City.

Awards
 Award for Poetry Roger Kowalski of the city of Lyon.
 1988 Mallarmé prize for exile and asylum for all his work.
 Au.tr.es Prize, for his novel A memorable was in 1998.

Works
 Le soleil se couche à Nippori, La Différence, 2007.
 À part et passager, La Différence, 2004.
 Un été mémorable, Gallimard, 1998. Prix Rhône-Alpes pour le Livre, 1998.
 Ruines-mères, La Différence, 1996. Réédition Le Cherche-Midi, 1998.
 Regards d'encre - Écrivains japonais 1966-1986, La Différence, 1995.
 
 Imaï, La Différence, 1990.
 Pouvoir de l'ombre, La Différence, 1989.
 Asile exil, La Différence, 1987.
 
 Histoire contemporaine, Gallimard, 1982.
 Morale provisoire, Gallimard, 1978.
 Maintenant les soleils (journal, poèmes), Gallimard, 1972.
 Ruptures, Gallimard, 1970.
 Le Cœur véhément, Gallimard, 1968.
 D'un pays lointain, Shichosha (Japon), 1965.
 Le Point vélique, Guy Chambelland, 1961.
 L'Atelier, Guy Chambelland, 1961.
 Le Feu du gel, éditions Armand Henneuse, 1959.
 Le Cœur de l'olivier, éditions Armand Henneuse, 1957.
 Sang et raisons d'une présence, Seghers, 1953.

Anthology

References

External links
"Breve etude de l'oeuvre de Jean Perol", Pierre Perrin, Autre Sud n° 28, mars 2005

20th-century French poets
20th-century French novelists
21st-century French novelists
1932 births
Living people
French male poets
French male novelists
20th-century French male writers
21st-century French male writers